Marquess of Astorga is a hereditary title in the Peerage of Spain, accompanied by the dignity of Grandee and granted in 1465 by Henry IV to Álvar Pérez Osorio, 2nd Count of Trastámara and captain general of Galicia and Asturias.

The title makes reference to the town of Astorga in León.

Marquesses of Astorga (1465)

Álvar Pérez Osorio, 1st Marquess of Astorga
Pedro Álvarez Osorio y Enríquez, 2nd Marquess of Astorga
Álvar Pérez Osorio y Quiñones, 3rd Marquess of Astorga
Pedro Álvarez Osorio y Sarmiento, 4th Marquess of Astorga
Álvar Pérez Osorio y Pimentel, 5th Marquess of Astorga
Antonio Pedro Álvarez Osorio y Álvarez de Toledo, 6th Marquess of Astorga
Alonso Álvarez Osorio y Quiñones, 7th Marquess of Astorga
Pedro Álvarez Osorio y Osorio, 8th Marquess of Astorga
Álvar Pérez Osorio y Manrique, 9th Marquess of Astorga
Antonio Pedro Dávila y Osorio, 10th Marquess of Astorga
Ana Dávila y Osorio, 11th Marchioness of Astorga
Melchor Francisco de Guzmán y Dávila, 12th Marquess of Astorga
Ana Nicolasa de Guzmán y Fernández de Córdoba, 13th Marchioness of Astorga
Ventura Antonio Osorio de Moscoso y Fernández de Córdoba, 14th Marquess of Astorga
Vicente Joaquín Osorio de Moscoso y Guzmán, 15th Marquess of Astorga 
Vicente Isabel Osorio de Moscoso y Álvarez de Toledo, 16th Marquess of Astorga
Vicente Pío Osorio de Moscoso y Ponce de León, 17th Marquess of Astorga
José María Osorio de Moscoso y Carvajal, 18th Marquess of Astorga
Francisco de Asís Osorio de Moscoso y de Borbón, 19th Marquess of Astorga
Francisco de Asís Osorio de Moscoso y Jordán de Urríes, 20th Marquess of Astorga
María del Perpetuo Socorro Osorio de Moscoso y Reynoso, 21st Marchioness of Astorga
Gonzalo Barón y Gavito, 22nd Marques of Astorga
María del Pilar Paloma de Casanova-Cárdenas y Barón, 23rd Marchioness of Astorga

See also
List of current Grandees of Spain

References 

Marquesses of Spain
Grandees of Spain
Lists of Spanish nobility